Jacob Goldstein is an American journalist, writer, and podcast host. He graduated from Stanford University with his bachelor's degree in English and from Columbia University with his master's degree in journalism. He has reported for The Wall Street Journal, the Miami Herald, and the Bozeman Daily Chronicle. He has also written for the New York Times Magazine. He was a correspondent and a co-host of the NPR podcast Planet Money and is also the author of the 2020 book, Money: The True Story of a Made-Up Thing. He now hosts the podcast What's Your Problem. 

Goldstein co-hosted episode 256 of the podcast Dear Hank and John (along with John Green) in September 2020.

Bibliography

References

External links 
 NPR Page for Jacob Goldstein

Living people
American economics writers
American male journalists
Stanford University alumni
Columbia College (New York) alumni
21st-century American non-fiction writers
Year of birth missing (living people)
21st-century American male writers